In the construction industry, black rocks that share the hardness and strength of granitic rocks are known as black granite. In geological terms, black granite might be gabbro, diabase, basalt, diorite, norite, or anorthosite.

References

Building stone